Trinity Church, founded by Alexander Shishkov in 1785 and consecrated in 1794, is the oldest surviving building of Pervitino estate, located in the central part of the Pervitino village in 15 kilometres from Likhoslavl, Tver Oblast, Russia, on the left bank of the Kava river. Modern address: Tver region, Likhoslavl district, village Pervitino, st. Sevastyanova, 31.

History 

The Trinity Church with murals was erected in 1785-1794 at the expense of the owner of the Pervitino manor Alexander Fedorovich Shishkov. Consecrated in 1794. The architectural style combines elements of late baroque and classicism. The building is a longline type of church (octagon on quadrangle), the refectory is made in connection with the bell tower. A remarkable example of provincial architecture of the XVIII century.

At the beginning of the 19th century, the Pervitino manor passed to the Khvostov family, which was closely related to the Shishkov family. Its first owner was the captain of artillery Nikolai Petrovich Khvostov. (1748-1829). He organized the purchase of new bells, as well as the construction of a stone fence around the Trinity Church.

After the 1917 revolution, the church was closed, services were not held. The building was used for economic needs of the Pervitinsk commune, then the F. Dzerzhinsky collective farm. Carved gilded iconostas of the middle of XIX century and the interior decor of the Trinity Church were lost.

Since 1974 the Trinity Church in Pervitino estate was designated by the Russian government as an architectural monument of federal significance (#691610586700006). In the same year the four corner towers of the stone fence of the Trinity Church were also included in the list of cultural heritage to be protected as monuments of national importance (#691610600190036).

In 2018, thanks to the Sergiy Srebryansky Foundation, a chapel was organized at the Trinity Church and a service was held for the first time in a hundred years.

Restoration work in the Trinity Church was not carried out. The murals of the dome and walls are partially lost due to desolation and vandalism. The object of cultural and historical heritage of federal importance needs urgent measures to prevent further destruction.

Gallery

See also 

 Pervitino, Likhoslavlsky District, Tver Oblast
 Pervitino estate
 Pervitino local history museum

References

Sources 

 Добровольский И. Тверской епархиальный статистический сборник. Тверь, 1901, No.11.
 Постановлением Совета Министров РСФСР No. 624 от 04.12.1974 «О дополнении и частичном изменении постановления Совета Министров РСФСР от 30 августа 1960 года № 1327 «О дальнейшем улучшении дела охраны памятников культуры в РСФСР».
 Тверская область. Энциклопедический справочник. Тверь, 1994.

External links 

 Постановлением Совета Министров РСФСР № 624 от 04.12.1974 «О дополнении и частичном изменении постановления Совета Министров РСФСР от 30 августа 1960 года № 1327 «О дальнейшем улучшении дела охраны памятников культуры в РСФСР»
 Троицкая церковь. Памятник градостроительства и архитектуры федерального значения
 Деревня Первитино
 18th Century Trinity Church in Pervitino Village, Tver Region (VIDEO)

18th-century Eastern Orthodox church buildings
Russian Orthodox church buildings in Russia
Churches completed in 1794
18th-century churches in Russia
Cultural heritage monuments of federal significance in Tver Oblast
Churches in Tver Oblast